

A preface or proem is an introduction to a book or other literary work written by the work's author. An introductory essay written by a different person is a foreword and precedes an author's preface. The preface often closes with acknowledgments of those who assisted in the literary work.

It often covers the story of how the book came into being, or how the idea for the book was developed; this may be followed by thanks and acknowledgments to people who were helpful to the author during the time of writing.

A preface is often signed (and the date and place of writing often follow the typeset signature); a foreword by another person is always signed. Information essential to the main text is generally placed in a set of explanatory notes, or perhaps in an "Introduction" that may be paginated with Arabic numerals, rather than in the preface. The term preface can also mean any preliminary or introductory statement. It is sometimes abbreviated pref.

Preface comes from Latin, meaning either "spoken before" (prae and fatia) or "made before" (prae + factum). While the former source of the word could have preface meaning the same as prologue, the latter strongly implies an introduction written before the body of the book. With this meaning of stated intention, British publishing up to at least the middle of the twentieth century distinguished between preface and introduction.

See also
 Abstract (legal)
 Abstract (summary)
 Epigraph
 Exordium
 Introduction
 Postface
 Preamble
 Prologue

References

Further reading
 A history of the preface in several languages is contained in: Tötösy de Zepetnek, Steven. The Social Dimensions of Fiction: On the Rhetoric and Function of Prefacing Novels in the Nineteenth-Century Canadas. Braunschweig-Wiesbaden: Westdeutscher (Friedr. Vieweg & Sohn), 1993. CLCWeb: Comparative Literature and Culture.
 The difference between a preface, foreword, and introduction, patmcnees.com

External links

Book design
Book terminology